Mark O'Donovan (born 7 November 1988) is an Irish lightweight rower. He won a gold medal at the 2017 World Rowing Championships in Sarasota, Florida with the lightweight men's coxless pair.

References

1988 births
Living people
Irish male rowers
World Rowing Championships medalists for Ireland
21st-century Irish people